The 2019–20 Incarnate Word Cardinals men's basketball team represented the University of the Incarnate Word during the 2019–20 NCAA Division I men's basketball season. The Cardinals were led by second-year head coach Carson Cunningham and played their home games at McDermott Convocation Center in San Antonio, Texas as members of the Southland Conference. They finished the season 10–21, 6–14 in Southland play to finish in tenth place. They failed to qualify for the Southland tournament.

Previous season
The Cardinals finished the 2018–19 season 6–25, 1–17 in Southland play to finish in 13th place. They failed to qualify for the Southland tournament.

Roster
Source:

Schedule and results
Source:  

|-
!colspan=9 style=| Regular season

See also 
2019–20 Incarnate Word Cardinals women's basketball team

References

Incarnate Word Cardinals men's basketball seasons
Incarnate Word
Incarnate Word Cardinals men's basketball
Incarnate Word Cardinals men's basketball